Kakrak in Afghanistan may refer to:

 Kakrak Valley, Ghazni Province
 Kakrak Valley, Bamyan Province